Sibilla, pseudonym of Sibyl Amarilli Mostert (born Zimbabwe, 14 April 1954), is an Italian singer, widely known for the song Oppio, that in the refrain, says Uru belev sameach (עורו אחים בלב שמח), a phrase that means Awake with a cheerful heart, taken from the text of the Hebrew folk song Hava Nagila.

In 1990, she participated in the creation of Paolo Conte's album Parole d'amore scritte a macchina. After this job, we lost sight of her.

Discography

 1976 - Keoma (Guido and Maurizio De Angelis) she sings Keoma under the name of "Sybil"
 1982 - Sud Africa (Battiato-Pio) / Alta tensione (Battiato-Pio) inedito
 1983 - Oppio (Battiato-Pio) / Svegliami (Battiato-Pio)
 1984 - Plaisir d'amour (Jean-Paul-Égide Martini) / Sex appeal to Europe (Battiato-Pio)
 1990 - La canoa di mezzanotte (Paolo Conte)

Filmography 
 1979 - Orchestra Rehearsal directed by Federico Fellini

Bibliography 

 AA.VV. Dizionario della canzone italiana, Armando Curcio Editore, 1990; at the page Sibilla
 Eddy Anselmi, Festival di Sanremo. Almanacco illustrato della canzone italiana, Panini Group, Modena, 2009; pagg. 335 and 900

References

External links
 

1954 births
Italian pop singers
Living people
Italian Italo disco musicians
20th-century Italian women singers
21st-century Italian women singers